Flight 152 may refer to:

Air France Flight 152, crashed on 3 August 1953
Garuda Indonesia Flight 152, crashed on 26 September 1997

0152